The 2016 World Wheelchair-B Curling Championship was held from November 4 to 11, 2016 at the Kisakallio Sports Institute in Lohja, Finland.

The qualification event is open to any World Curling Federation member nation not already qualified for the 2017 World Wheelchair Curling Championship. 

Teams

Round robin standings

Tiebreaker
Wednesday, November 9, 14:00

Playoffs

Qualification games
Wednesday, November 9, 18:30

Semifinals
Thursday, November 10, 9:30

Bronze medal game
Thursday, November 10, 14:30

Final
Thursday, November 10, 14:30

Final standings

References

External links

Video:  (YouTube-channel "Curling Finland")

World Wheelchair Curling Championship
World Wheelchair-B
World Wheelchair-B Curling
International curling competitions hosted by Finland
Lohja